North Hastings High School (NHHS) is a high school located in Bancroft, Ontario, Canada serving students in the northern portion of Hastings County and part of the Hastings and Prince Edward District School Board. NHHS offers specialized 4-credit courses which allow students to learn principles of resource management and environmental studies, which help them to gain employment in resource-based careers.

See also
List of high schools in Ontario

References

External links
Official web site
School Profile at the Hastings and Prince Edward District School Board web site
Profile at the Education Quality and Accountability Office (EQAO) web site

High schools in Hastings County
Educational institutions in Canada with year of establishment missing